The United Republican Party may refer to:
United Republican Party (Grenada)
United Republican Party (Guyana)
United Republican Party (Kenya)